Daby is a surname. Notable people with the surname include:

Ajay Daby, Mauritian barrister and speaker
Janet Daby (born 1970), British politician

See also
Daby Island, California island
Danby (surname)
Maby